Alice Eklund (21 July 1896 – 6 October 1983) was a Swedish stage and TV actress. She also directed one film in 1936.

She was the daughter of actress Anna Hofman-Uddgren (1868–1947) and was married to actor Ernst Eklund (1882–1971). Together with her husband she managed and performed at several theaters, among others: Blancheteatern and Comediteatern.

Selected filmography

 The Girls of Uppakra (1936)
Fånga en fallande stjärna (1963)
Patrasket (1966)
Mästerdetektiven Blomkvist på nya äventyr (1966)
Barnen i Höjden (1973)

References

Further reading

External links

1896 births
1983 deaths
Swedish television actresses
20th-century Swedish actresses